Belmond Savute Elephant Lodge is a safari lodge in Chobe National Park in Botswana. Chobe was the country’s first national park and is its third largest.

The lodge is one of three that comprise Belmond Safaris, the others being Belmond Eagle Island Lodge and Belmond Khwai River Lodge. All three are reached from Maun, Botswana.

The lodge consists of tented accommodation with traditional African thatched roofs, on raised wooden stilts.

The river was dry for many years, but resumed flowing a few years ago. The park attracts a profusion of elephants, sometimes up to 5000 at one time, as well as reptiles, other big game and birds.

All three lodges that form Belmond Safaris were acquired by Orient-Express Hotels in 1992 under their original name of Gametrackers. In 2014 the company changed its name to Belmond Ltd. and the lodge was renamed Belmond Savute Elephant Lodge

References

External links 
 

Belmond hotels
Hotels in Botswana